The Fujifilm X-E4 is the latest digital rangefinder-style mirrorless camera by Fujifilm. The camera was announced on January 27, 2021, at the X Summit Global 2021 together with the GFX100S. It is part of the company's X-series range of cameras positioned for enthusiast photographers. It was released in March 2021.

The Fujifilm X-E4 is thinner than the X-E3 by a centimeter. Unlike its predecessor, the grip of the new camera has been removed. The camera consists of the same 26.1-megapixel, back-side illuminated but with a newer processor, the X-Trans CMOS 4 sensor which is also found in FujiFilm's flagship cameras.

The camera has a 180° forward-tilting LCD touchscreen. The camera is able to record at 4K/30p and Full-HD/240 fps videos.

In September 2022, major Japanese retailers started listing the Fujifilm X-E4 as discontinued.

Key features 

 26MP APS-C sensor with X-Trans color filter array
 3.0" tilting touchscreen with 1.62M dots (can tilt up 180 degrees)
 4K at 30fps and Full HD at 240 fps videos
 8 fps burst shooting with mechanical shutter (20 fps with electronic)
 CIPA rated to 380 shots per charge

See also
 Fujifilm X series
 Fujifilm cameras

References

External links

Mirrorless cameras
Cameras introduced in 2021
X-E4